Théophile Emmanuel Duverger (17 March 1821, in Bordeaux – 25 August 1898, in Écouen)  was a French painter. He was the stepfather of painter André-Henri Dargelas.

Duverger was a self-taught painter who learned by observing nature and the works of great painters. He was an exhibitor at the Paris Salon from 1846 and showed portraits of women. Subsequently he dealt primarily genre scenes. He received a third class medal at the Salon of 1861, with a reminder in 1863. He won another medal in 1865.

His painting The worker and his children (Fr. Le laboureur et ses enfants) was bought by the State in 1865 for the Musée du Luxembourg in Paris and now in the collection of the Musée d'Orsay.

Works 

 Portrait of Melle Z. D., Salon of 1846
 Portrait of M. Leglu, Salon of 1847
 Portrait of M. T.. E.. D.., Salon of 1847
 Démence de Charles VI, Salon of 1848
 Portrait of M..., Salon of 1848
 Portraits d'enfant, Salon of 1848
 Portrait of Mme G..., Salon of 1852
 Le mot pour rire, Salon of 1853
 Les larmes du foyer, Salon of 1855
 La visite, Salon of 1857
 La partie chez la grand'maman, Salon of 1857
 La visite de la nourrice, Salon of 1859
 L'étable, Salon of 1859,
 La blanchisseuse, Salon of 1859
 L'hospitalité, Salon of 1859
 Les dames de charité, Salon of 1859
 La gamelle de grand papa, salon of 1861
 L'attente, Salon of 1861
 L'écharde, Salon of 1861
 La convalescence, Salon of 1861
 Les dames de charité, Salon of 1861
 Les derniers sacrements, Salon of 1863
 Les Bohémiens, Salon of 1863
 La recette de l'aveugle, Salon of 1863
 Cache-cache, Salon of 1864 (Musée du Luxembourg), shown again in 1867
 La retenue, Salon of 1864
 Le paralytique, Salon of 1865
 Le laboureur et ses enfants, Salon of 1865 (Musée du Luxembourg)
 La fille repentante; bourg de Batz, Salon of 1866
 La confirmation dans l'église de Villiers-le-Bel, Salon of 1867
 Le berceau vide; bourg de Batz dans la Loire-Inférieure, Salon of 1868
 La première fredaine, Salon of 1868
 Sollicitude maternelle, Salon of 1869
 Sollicitude filiale, vingt ans après, Salon of 1869
 Scène bretonne, Salon of 1869
 Vice et misère, Salon of 1870
 Travail et bonheur, Salon of 1870
 Les Cascarottes, Saint-Jean-de-Lutz (Pyrénées-Atlantiques), Salon of 1872
 La retenue, Salon of 1873,
 Quand les chats n'y sont pas, les souris dansent, Salon of 1874
 L'enfant aux fruits, Salon of 1875
 Retour de marché, Salon of 1875
 Trop de reconnaissance, Salon of 1876
 L'aiguille de la grand'maman, Salon of 1877
 Une allée de jardin à Écouen, Salon of 1877
 Convalescence, Exposition Universelle (1878)
 Flagrant délit, Exposition Universelle (1878)
 L'intempérance, Exposition Universelle (1878)
 La fête de la grand'maman, Salon of 1879
 Les orphelins, Salon of 1879
 Le pitre, Salon of 1880
 En retenue, Salon of 1880
 Le braconnier, Salon of 1881
 Avant la messe, Salon of 1881
 Les petits ours, Salon of 1882

Gallery

References

1821 births
1898 deaths
19th-century French painters
French male painters
French genre painters
Artists from Bordeaux
19th-century French male artists